The 2016 GT Asia Series was the seventh season of the GT Asia Series championship. It began on 14 May at the Korea International Circuit and ended at Shanghai International Circuit on 19-20 October, 2016 after 12 championship rounds.

Entry list

Race calendar and results

The full calendar for the 2016 season was released on 12 January 2016. The series will consist of 12 championship rounds held in pairs on six circuits across Korea, Thailand, Japan and China. The 3-hour race at Sepang International Circuit will be discontinued after teams voted against it. Also, the non-championship round at the Circuito da Guia in Macau does not feature in the calendar, now the main event of the FIA GT World Cup. The championship would have concluded at the new Zhejiang International Circuit, but delays in the final stages of construction had seen Motorsport Asia Limited make alternate plans. On September 9, it was decided to return to Shanghai for the last two rounds, both run on Thursday 20 October.

References

External links

GT Asia Series seasons
GT Asia Series
GT Asia Series